Bellemore is a surname. Notable people with the surname include:

 Bob Bellemore, American ice hockey goaltending coach
 Brett Bellemore (born 1988), Canadian ice hockey player

See also
 Bellemare
 Bellmore (disambiguation)